David A. Unger (born December 30, 1971) is CEO of Artist International Group, a global talent management, branding and content production company representing clients in the fields of film, television and media advisory. Born in London, Unger has served as a talent and literary agent for over 20 years.

Artist International Group
In 2017, Unger founded Artist International Group which focuses on identifying and nurturing talent, developing IP and sourcing diversified media and entertainment opportunities, all with a global insight. The company represents actors, writers, directors, musicians and models and specializes in media finance, brand advisory and international business development. The company is based in Los Angeles with offices in London, Paris, Hong Kong, and Seoul.

Unger represents several Academy Award, Golden Globe, Grammy and BAFTA winning clients and leading international artists including Sharon Stone, Jonathan Rhys Meyers, Donnie Yen, Leehom Wang, Hanee Lee, Siwon Choi, Lee Min-ho, Fan Bingbing, Gong Li, Academy Award winner Michelle Yeoh, Mallika Sherawat, Raline Shah, Sonam Kapoor, Anil Kapoor, Elsa Zylberstein, Rossy de Palma, Tom Welling, Christopher Lambert, Patrick Bruel, Dita Von Teese, Sasha Luss, Nastassja Kinski, Natalia Vodianova, Mallika Sherawat, Saïd Taghmaoui and Sonia Yuan. He represents directors Amanda Sthers, Michael Haussman, Francesco Carrozzini, Antony Hoffman, Alexei Sidorov, Emanuele Della Valle, Tony Kaye, Academy Award winner Roger Avary, and others.

Early career
Unger began his career at Propaganda Films, a division of PolyGram, where he nurtured the careers of directors David Fincher, Michael Bay, Antoine Fuqua, and Mark Romanek among others. He developed award-winning commercial projects for Coca-Cola, Levi's and Nike as well as music videos for artists such as Madonna, The Rolling Stones and U2.

At the age of 27 Unger was chosen for The Hollywood Reporters Annual "Next Gen" special issue, which lists "the city's best and brightest individuals – 35 men and women, age 35 and under, poised to become the entertainment industry's future leaders." He was recognized by Fade In magazine as one of their "Top 100 People in Hollywood You Need to Know."

Unger was a vice-president and talent agent at International Creative Management for 15 years. At ICM, he represented actors, directors and writers as well as advised the agency's branding and film financing groups. In October 2012, ICM became ICM Partners and in January 2013. Unger became the first ICM agent to join former ICM Chairman Jeff Berg at Berg's newly-founded agency, Resolution. Unger served as talent and literary agent at Resolution and he was a member of Resolution's Media Finance Group for two years.

In February 2015 Unger, as Co-Chief Executive Officer and Partner, formed Three Six Zero Entertainment, a full service management company that represented actors, directors and writers in the film, television, and digital industries. The company offered branding and financial services to clients and operated in partnership with Jay-Z's Roc Nation.

Film production
Unger is known for representing international talent, often successfully transforming local language stars into global stars. He is credited with resurrecting the career of Mickey Rourke, who thanked Unger in his Best Actor-winning speeches for his role in The Wrestler at the BAFTA Awards and the Golden Globe Awards.

Unger regularly attends and is often asked to lecture at the major international motion picture and television festivals and markets such as the Moscow Business Square at the Moscow International Film Festival, Asian Film Summit at the Toronto International Film Festival, and Busan International Film Festival among others.

Unger is an executive producer of the films Wetlands, Habit, Ambush and Edge of the World, both starring Jonathan Rhys Meyers; Mother Tongue, starring Josie Ho; Promises, directed by Amanda Sthers, as well as the documentaries  Sheroes, Bonnie, and Josie Ho & The Hong Kong Sound. He has also been involved in such award-winning film and television projects as Crazy Rich Asians, Slumdog Millionaire, Training Day, The Wrestler, Sin City, Memoirs of a Geisha, and Star Trek: Discovery.

Other activities
Unger is an advisor to the immersive theme park company KidZania and to the education technology company MasterClass. He is a member of the Board of Advisors of Big Life Foundation which contributes to efforts in protecting wildlife habitats in East Africa.

Background 
Unger was born in London and raised in London, Madrid, Paris, and Los Angeles. He is a graduate of Boston University and has lectured at Harvard Business School, UCLA Anderson School of Management and USC School of Cinematic Arts. He speaks English, Spanish, Italian, and French; he holds US and European passports.

Unger comes from a long line of successful entertainment industry executives. His father, Anthony B. Unger, produced numerous motion pictures including the highly acclaimed Don't Look Now, starring Donald Sutherland and Julie Christie. His grandfather, Oliver A. Unger, was an award-winning film producer, distributor and exhibitor. His uncle, Stephen A. Unger, is a leading executive recruiter for the entertainment and media industries.

References

External links

David Unger interview at BNET Video

1971 births
Living people
Literary agents
Boston University alumni
Hollywood talent agents
American film producers
American documentary film producers
Film producers from London